The 338th Combat Training Squadron is a United States Air Force unit. It is assigned to the 55th Operations Group, stationed at Offut Air Force Base, Nebraska. The 338 CTS performs the initial, requalification, and upgrade training as the RC-135 "Rivet Joint", "Cobra Ball", and "Combat Sent" Formal Training Unit (FTU).

Mission
The 338th Combat Training Squadron (CTS) is a flying organization. It performs the initial, difference, requalification, and upgrade training as the Formal Training Unit (FTU) for the largest and most diverse operations group in Air Combat Command.  Specifically, it provides the aforementioned training programs in accordance with HHQ approved training syllabi mostly for the RC-135 "Rivet Joint", "Cobra Ball", and "Combat Sent" variants and the E-4B "Nightwatch."  The unit prepares eight squadrons in six different programs to execute worldwide reconnaissance, command and control, and treaty verification missions directed by the NCA, JCS, theater CINCs, MAJCOM commanders and national intelligence agencies.

History
Established in late 1942 as a P-38 Lightning fighter squadron, it trained under the Second Air Force in the Pacific northwest. It deployed to the European Theater of Operations (ETO), where it was assigned to VIII Fighter Command in England in late 1943. The squadron's mission was to provide long range fighter escort for B-17 Flying Fortress and B-24 Liberator heavy bombers on strategic bombing missions over Occupied Europe and Nazi Germany. In April 1944 it received P-51D Mustang fighter aircraft and continued its primary task of escorting B-17 and B-24 bombers that attacked such targets as industries and marshalling yards in Germany and airfields and V-weapon sites in France.

The squadron flew air patrols over the English Channel and bombed bridges in the Tours area during the Invasion of France in June 1944. In July it attacked gun emplacements during the Saint-Lô break out. The unit patrolled the Arnhem sector to support the airborne operation in the Netherlands in September 1944, and in December, transportation facilities during the Battle of the Bulge. During the Western Allied invasion of Germany, the squadron flew ground support missions by strafing trucks, locomotives and oil depots near Wesel when the Allies crossed the Rhine in March 1945; it continued offensive operations until 21 April 1945.

After the German capitulation, the unit became part of the United States Air Forces in Europe Army of Occupation, at AAF Station Kaufbeuren, then moved to AAF Station Giebelstadt in early 1946 where it received its first jet aircraft, the P-80A Shooting Star. Ii was inactivated in August 1946, when personnel were demobilized and its aircraft were transferred to the 31st Fighter Group.

The squadron was reactivated by the Strategic Air Command (SAC) in 1947 as a reconnaissance unit, equipped with RB-17 Flying Fortresses. It flew aerial photography, mapping, charting and photo reconnaissance missions, some of which were around the borders of the Soviet Union and over the Soviet Occupation Zone of Germany. Little was known about the air defense capability of the Soviet Union at this time, the most effective way of determining its capability was to probe the borders and see whether it would respond. Gradually the RB-17s and other aircraft mapped the perimeter of the Soviet Air Defenses from the Baltic to the Sea of Okhotsk, north of Japan.

The unit upgraded to RB-29 Superfotress aircraft in 1949 and continued its reconnaissance mission, however it was inactivated in 1949 due to budget reductions. Reactivated in 1950 at Ramey Air Force Base, Puerto Rico, it was again flying RB-29s, performing strategic reconnaissance, charting photography, precise electronic geodetic mapping and electronic reconnaissance missions. The squadron upgraded to RB-50 Superfortresses in 1952.

In 1954 it was equipped with RB-47K Stratojets, a variant of the B-47 which contained Side-Looking Radar and air sampling equipment. The RB-47K's primary mission was meteorological data collection and weather reconnaissance from Forbes AFB, Kansas. Photographic reconnaissance was a secondary mission. These missions consisted of flying over northern Canadian skies, with two such sorties being flown in a day, Weather Alpha and Weather Bravo. Weather Alpha sorties consisted of a flight from Forbes AFB, north to Saute Ste. Marie, Michigan, then north to Hudson's Bay, counterclockwise around the perimeter of the Bay and then back to Forbes. Weather Bravo took the same route within the United States but traveled east over the Labrador Sea and north of Goose Bay, Canada, then back to Forbes. The data collected by these flights was used to develop War Plan meteorological collection predictions for weather around the Soviet Union. Samples of radioactive fallout from foreign nuclear tests could also be taken. The RB-37Ks served with the 338th for eight years, being phased out in 1963.

The unit was reactivated in 1999 at Offut AFB, Nebraska as a Combat Training Squadron.

Lineage
 Constituted as the 338th Fighter Squadron (Two Engine) on 10 September 1942
 Activated on 12 September 1942
 Redesignated 338th Fighter Squadron, Twin Engine on 20 August 1943
 Redesignated 338th Fighter Squadron, Single Engine on 5 September 1944
 Inactivated on 20 August 1946
 Redesignated 338th Reconnaissance Squadron, Very Long Range, Mapping on 3 February 1947
 Activated on 15 March 1947
 Redesignated 338th Strategic Reconnaissance Squadron, Photographic-Mapping on 1 July 1949
 Inactivated on 14 October 1949
 Redesignated 338th Strategic Reconnaissance Squadron, Medium, Photographic-Mapping on 27 October 1950
 Activated on 1 November 1950
 Redesignated 338th Strategic Reconnaissance Squadron, Medium on 15 July 1954
 Discontinued and inactivated on 15 June 1963
 Redesignated 338th Strategic Reconnaissance Squadron and activated on 24 February 1967 (not organized)
 Organized on 25 March 1967
 Discontinued and inactivated on 25 December 1967
 Redesignated 338th Combat Training Squadron on 7 September 1999
 Activated on 20 September 1999

Assignments
 55th Fighter Group, 12 Sep 1942 – 20 Aug 1946
 5th Reconnaissance Group, 15 March 1947
 Strategic Air Command, 26 May 1949
 55th Strategic Reconnaissance Group, 1 Jun-14 Oct 1949; 1 November 1950
 Attached to 91st Strategic Reconnaissance Wing, 1 Nov-1 Dec 1950
 55th Strategic Reconnaissance Wing, 16 Jun 1952 – 15 Jun 1963
 Strategic Air Command, 24 February 1967
 55th Strategic Reconnaissance Wing, 25 March-25 Dec 1967
 55th Operations Group, 20 Sep 1999–Present

Stations

 Paine Field, Washington, 12 September 1942
 McChord Field, Washington, 12 Sep 1942 – 20 Aug 1943
 RAF Nuthampstead (AAF-131), England, 14 September 1943
 RAF Wormingford (AAF-159), England, 16 April 1944
 AAF Station Kaufbeuren, Germany, 22 July 1945
 AAF Station Giebelstadt, Germany, 30 Apr-20 Aug 1946
 Harmon Field AAB, Guam, 15 March 1947
 Los Negros Island, 20 June 1947

 Clark Field, Philippines, 9 Jan 1948 – 6 May 1949
 Fairfield-Suisun AFB, California, 26 May 1949
 Topeka (later, Forbes) AFB, Kansas, 1 Jun-14 Oct 1949
 Barksdale AFB, Louisiana, 1 November 1950
 Ramey AFB, Puerto Rico, 25 November 1950
 Forbes AFB, Kansas 21 Oct 1952 – 15 Jun 1963
 Offutt Air Force Base Nebraska, 24 Feb-25 Dec 1967; 20 Sep 1999–Present

Aircraft
 P-38, 1942–1944
 P-51, 1944–1946
 F-13, 1947
 F-2, 1947–1949
 RB-17, 1947–1949
 B-29, 1949; RB-29, 1950–1951
 RB-50, 1950–1954
 RB-47, 1954–1963; EB/RB-47, 1967.

References

 Notes

 Citations

Bibliography

 
 
 

0338